The 2004 Trophée des Champions was a football match held at Stade Pierre de Coubertin, Cannes on 31 July 2004, that saw 2003–04 Ligue 1 champions Olympique Lyonnais defeat 2004 Coupe de France winners Paris Saint-Germain 7–6 on penalty kicks after a draw of 1–1.

Match details

See also
2004–05 Ligue 1

2004–05 in French football
2004
Paris Saint-Germain F.C. matches
Olympique Lyonnais matches
Association football penalty shoot-outs
July 2004 sports events in France
Sport in Cannes